Castle Island is part of the chain which makes up Bermuda. It is located in St. George's Parish, in the northeast of the territory.

The  island is situated close to the entrance to Castle Harbour, to the north of the Tucker's Town Peninsula.

Originally called King's Island, it is of historical significance. The King's Castle stone fortification on the island - which gives the harbour its name - dates to 1612, and is the oldest standing English fortification in the Americas and oldest stone building still in existence in Bermuda. The castle was the site of the successful defence of Bermuda from Spanish attack in 1614.

Several other fortifications from the same period are located on this, and nearby islands. This string of small islands, across the south of Castle Harbour, are known collectively as the Castle Islands. These forts, together with St. George's Town, and other forts in the parish, are part of the UNESCO World Heritage Site "Historic Town of St George and Related Fortifications".

References

Islands of Bermuda
St. George's Parish, Bermuda
1612 establishments in the British Empire